The Speaker of the House of Assembly of Newfoundland and Labrador is the presiding officer of the Newfoundland and Labrador House of Assembly.

The current Speaker of the Newfoundland and Labrador House of Assembly is Derek Bennett since April 12, 2021.

Speakers of the Newfoundland and Labrador House of Assembly

References

External links
 The Speaker of the House

See also
Speaker (politics)

Politics of Newfoundland and Labrador
Newfoundland And Labrador